The Egypt men's national water polo team is the representative for Egypt in international men's water polo.

Results

Olympic Games

1948 — 7th place
1952 — 10th place
1960 — 13th place
1964 — 12th place
1968 — 15th place
2004 — 12th place

World Championship
1982 — 15th place
1991 — 15th place

FINA World League
 2008 — 10th place

See also
 Egypt men's Olympic water polo team records and statistics

References

Men's national water polo teams
Men
Men's sport in Egypt